Ostrorógu Castle is a castle on a peninsula (formerly an island) in Ostroróg in Greater Poland Voivodeship. Ostrorógu Castle was probably built around the middle of the 14th century by the ancestors of Jan Ostroróg.

References 

Castles in Greater Poland Voivodeship